Issaquah High School (also known as IHS or Issaquah) is a four-year public secondary school in Issaquah, Washington, United States, a suburb east of Seattle. It is one of three high schools in the Issaquah School District and serves students in grades 9–12 from the central portion of the district. Issaquah High serves the cities of Issaquah, Sammamish, and Bellevue.

History
Founded in 1901, IHS was the only high school in the school district until Liberty High School opened in 1977. Previously located near the Issaquah Middle School campus, IHS moved to its present site in southeast Issaquah in 1962.

Growth of enrollment at IHS has coincided with the growth of the Issaquah community. The Issaquah School District completed the construction of the Pacific Cascade Freshman Campus in 2005, making it the new home to the freshman class of IHS and nearby Skyline High School. IHS enrolled only three school grades (10–12) for five academic years (2005–10) while an extensive remodeling of the school took place.  The cost of the remodel totaled $61,500,000. IHS is now the district's largest school.  The three stories accommodate 1,850 students. There are three classroom wings, science labs, a main and auxiliary gym, commons, and administrative spaces.

Mascot change
In 2003, the school changed its team name from "Indians" to "Eagles". The change came after The Church Council of Greater Seattle adopted a resolution calling for an end to all Native American imagery in school mascots in 2002.

Controversy 
In March 2019, a female student created a poster with a reference to black slavery in order to ask out a male classmate to Tolo, an annual school dance, which many deemed offensive. As a response to the resulting media coverage surrounding the incident, IHS students staged a walkout in which they denounced hate and racism.

Academics
Issaquah High offers the Advanced Placement program, with more than 16 college-level courses. In 2013, IHS had 11 National Merit Finalists and 24 National Merit Commended Scholars. More than 90% of IHS students earned a 3 or better in AP exams.

The Advanced Sports Med Class placed 1st at National Competition and were the WCTSMA Team State Champions.

Staff
In 2013–14 IHS staff includes 103 certified and 44 classified staff. Over half of the certificated staff have master's degrees.

Notable alumni
 Isaac Brock - lead singer of Modest Mouse
 Colin Curtis - MLB outfielder for the New York Yankees (class of 2003)
 Kate Deines - Women's Professional Soccer player for the Seattle Sounders Women
 Alec Diaz - professional soccer player for the Tacoma Defiance (class of 2020)
 Don Hover - NFL linebacker for the Washington Redskins (class of 1973)
 Jennie Reed - world and U.S. national champion track cyclist and Olympian
 Brian Yorkey - Broadway writer and lyricist

References

External links 
 
 Issaquah School District: Issaquah High School
 Office of the WA State Superintendent of Public Instruction Issaquah High School

High schools in King County, Washington
Educational institutions established in 1905
Issaquah, Washington
Public high schools in Washington (state)
1905 establishments in Washington (state)